The Miracle Worker is a 2000 American made-for-television biographical film based on the 1959 play of the same title by William Gibson, which originated as a 1957 broadcast of the television anthology series Playhouse 90. Gibson's original source material was The Story of My Life, the 1903 autobiography of Helen Keller. The play was adapted for the screen twice before, in 1962 and 1979. The film is based on the life of Helen Keller and Anne Sullivan's struggles to teach her. The film premiered on ABC as part of The Wonderful World of Disney on November 12, 2000.

Plot
In the 1880s, Anne Sullivan, and her efforts in working with young Helen Keller. The film focuses on Anne's struggle to draw Helen, a blind and prelingually deaf girl out of her world of darkness and silence. Helen has been unable to communicate with her family except through physical temper tantrums since an illness took her eyesight and hearing from her at the age of 19 months old. She is allowed to eat other people's food with her hands, knock over or break items, and basically do whatever else she desires. All of this while being looked at with pity by her family. Her family loves her, but they are all convinced she is a dumb, soft-brained, and savage child with the intelligence of an animal who will never learn anything. She is barely pacified with candy when she throws a tantrum, and is headed toward mental institutionalization in an asylum when Anne enters her life as Helen's parents' last-ditch effort to avoid the inevitable.

Plagued with vision problems of her own and orphaned at a young age, Anne has the right mix of steeliness, empathy and patience to turn her young student's behavior around and teach her language. Anne's job as Helen's teacher is made more difficult by Helen's imperious plantation-owner father, Captain Arthur, and her overly soft-hearted mother, Kate, when they doubt her authority and challenge her methods. Anne's goal is to not just teach Helen to behave but to give her gift of communication. Using sign language and signing the letters to spell words in Helen's open palm, Annie makes large strides toward improving Helen's behavior.

After two weeks of living alone with Helen in a small house on the Keller family plantation, Annie is still unable to reach a breakthrough with Helen when her mandated time deadline is reached. During Helen's homecoming dinner, she begins to revert to her old ways of misbehavior. Anne takes Helen outside to the pump to refill a water pitcher she spilled during one of her tantrums, and the long-awaited breakthrough is made. Helen makes the connection that the words Anne has been spelling in her open palm are in reality the communicative representation of those things in the physical world around her. The word "water" is the wet fluid coming out of the water pump. With this connection the doorway for communication is opened to Helen, and she can now survive and thrive in the world through the eyes and ears of others.

See also
 The Miracle Worker (1962 film)
 The Miracle Worker (1979 film)
 Black (2005 film)
 List of films featuring the deaf and hard of hearing

External links
 

2000 television films
2000 films
2000
Remakes of American films
Films about blind people
Films about deaf people
Films about educators
Films directed by Nadia Tass
Disney television films
American Sign Language films